School District 16 is a Canadian school district in New Brunswick.

District 16 is an Anglophone district operating 21 public schools (gr. K-12) in Northumberland and Kent Counties.

Current enrollment is approximately 6,500s students and 440 teachers. District 16 is headquartered in Miramichi.

List of schools

High schools
 Bonar Law Memorial School
 Miramichi Valley High School
 North & South Esk Regional High School
 James M. Hill Memorial High School

Middle schools
 Dr. Losier Middle School
 Eleanor W. Graham Middle School

Elementary schools
 Harcourt School
 Ian Baillie Primary School
 Napan Elementary School
 North & South Esk Elementary School
 Rexton Elementary School

Combined elementary and middle schools
 Gretna Green School
 Max Aitken Academy
 Millerton Elementary & Junior High School
 Miramichi Rural School
 Nelson Rural School
 Tabusintac Rural School
 King Street Elementary School

Other schools
 Big Cove Site
 Blackville School
 New Brunswick Youth Centre
 Rexton & Area Learning Centre
 The Learning Center-Miramichi
 Eel Ground School

External links
 http://www.district16.nbed.nb.ca

Former school districts in New Brunswick